Tutchi (also Romanized as Tūtchī; also known as Ţūţchī-ye ‘Olyā) is a village in Tudeshk Rural District, Kuhpayeh District, Isfahan County, Isfahan Province, Iran. In 2006, its population was 47, in 10 families.

References 

Populated places in Isfahan County